Nestor Ortiz Mena (born September 20, 1968) is a former Colombian football player who played defense.

He played much of his career for Once Caldas. He was a member of the Colombia national football team that participated in the 1994 FIFA World Cup.

References

1968 births
Living people
Association football defenders
Colombian footballers
Colombia international footballers
1994 FIFA World Cup players
Once Caldas footballers
Deportes Tolima footballers
Millonarios F.C. players
Deportivo Pasto footballers
Independiente Santa Fe footballers
Carabobo F.C. players
Deportivo Anzoátegui players
Categoría Primera A players
Colombian expatriate footballers
Expatriate footballers in Venezuela
Sportspeople from Antioquia Department